SS Karnak was a French Passenger ship turned Troop transport that the German submarine SM U-32 torpedoed on 27 November 1916 in the Mediterranean Sea  south south east of Valletta, Malta. Karnak was carrying mostly troops from Marseille and Malta to Saloniki, Greece.

Construction 
Karnak was built at the Messageries Maritimes shipyard in La Ciotat, France in 1898. Where she was launched and completed the following year. The ship could reach a maximum speed of 18 knots with her 20 boilers generating 832 n.h.p.. She also had 2 funnels and a white hull which was later repainted to black.

Sinking 
During World War I Karnak was used as a Troop transport by the French admiralty mainly on the route Marseille - Malta - Saloniki. The ship sank in 15 minutes and claimed the lives of 17 people, but the number of survivors is unknown.

Wreck 

References

1898 ships
Ship names
Ships built in France
Steamships of France
Passenger ships of France
World War I shipwrecks in the Mediterranean Sea
Ships sunk by German submarines in World War I
Maritime incidents in 1916